LHS 475 b is a terrestrial planet orbiting the star LHS 475 at about 40.7 light years away, in the constellation of Octans. It was the first extrasolar planet to be confirmed by the James Webb Space Telescope. It completes an orbit every 2 days and is 99% the diameter of Earth. It is also one of the most similar-to-Earth exoplanets discovered, in terms of radius.

References 

Exoplanets discovered in 2023
Transiting exoplanets
James Webb Space Telescope
Near-Earth-sized exoplanets